Nilo Menéndez Barnet (Matanzas, 26 September 1902 - Burbank, California, 15 September 1987) was a Cuban-born naturalized American songwriter. Menéndez came to the United States in 1924 when he was 22. He wrote his best known song "Aquellos Ojos Verdes" in 1929 and was recorded several times by Latin artists and translated into English in 1931. The song became a major hit when Jimmy Dorsey recorded it as "Green Eyes" around 1941.

References

1902 births
1987 deaths
20th-century composers
Cuban emigrants to the United States
People with acquired American citizenship